This is an incomplete list of breweries in Quebec sorted by region. Breweries have been cropping up steadily over the past 30 to 40 years in the province of Québec, Canada. There are now 150 active breweries producing 3,348 different beers. According to BeerAdvocate, 46 of the top 100 beers in Canada are brewed in Quebec.

Abitibi-Témiscamingue 

 Belgh Brasse (Since 1999) (Amos)

Capitale-Nationale 
 La Barberie (Since 1997) (Québec city)

Laurentides 
 Les Brasseurs du Nord (Since 1988) (Blainville)

Montérégie 
 Unibroue (Since 1991) (Sapporo) (Chambly)

Montréal 

Brewery
Labatt Brewing Company, From London, Ontario, new brewery in LaSalle Since 1954
Molson (Since 1786) (Montréal)
Dow Breweries (1790 - 1967) First established in La Prairie then in Montréal
 McAuslan Brewing (Since 1989) (Montréal)

Brewpub:
 Le Cheval Blanc (Since 1986) (Montréal)

Microbrewery:
 Les Brasseurs RJ (Since 1998) (Montréal)

See also 

 Beer and breweries by region
 Quebec beer
 List of breweries in Canada

Notes

Sources 

 Richard Stueven. "Breweries in Québec, Canada", in Beer Me!, 2008
 Bières et plaisirs. "Toutes les brasseries", in Bières et plaisirs, August 2008 
« Microbrasseries », Website Institut de la bière, 2008 
« All brewerys, address, email and social network», Website Ça Brasse !, 2012 
«  Beer's promoting and Rating,  », Website BeerAdvocate, Boston (Mass), 1996 - 2013

Breweries_in_Quebec

Breweries